Alison Brewer is an American former ice hockey goaltender. She was goaltender for Brown University and was the 2000 winner of the Patty Kazmaier Memorial Award. Brewer was inducted into Brown’s Hall of Fame in 2007.

Playing career
In the 1999–2000 season, Ali Brewer led the ECAC with a 1.33 goals-against average and compiled a 21-3-3 record. During the season, she was named the ECAC goaltender of the week three times. Brewer was an integral part of Brown qualifying for the 2000 AWCHA national semifinals.

Brewer holds every Brown goaltending record for a season or a career. In her four seasons with the Bears, she posted a 1.37 goals-against average and a .943 save percentage. In addition, she had 2,490 saves and posting 39 shutouts. Numerous records were set by Brewer including, a 0.94 GAA and .957 save percentage in her freshman season, 13 shutouts in her junior season, and 25 wins in her senior campaign. Another record that she holds is five consecutive shutouts, set her junior season, in which she blanked Cornell (3-0), St. Lawrence University (5-0), Niagara University twice (6-0 both games), and Colby College (9-0).

During Brewer’s four seasons, the Bears never won fewer than 20 games in a season. The Bears won ECAC Championships in 1998 and 2000, with Brewer earning MVP honors during the 2000 Championship. The Bears also played in the AWCHA Tournament three times from 1998–2000, finishing as the national runner-up twice.
After one year with the US Women's National Team, Brewer spent four years working for Fidelity Investments in Boston. She pursued her education at the University of Wisconsin, Madison School of Business, where she specialized in Marketing and Brand Management. She has made several appearances as a guest analyst on USCHO.com's Game of the Week broadcasts.

International
Brewer was part of the United States Select Team roster that competed at the 1999 Christmas Cup tournament in Füssen, Germany, December 27–30, 1999.

Awards and honors
 1998 and 2000 ECAC Tournament Most Valuable Player
 Patty Kazmaier Award Finalist, 1999
 Patty Kazmaier Award (2000)
 Academic All-Ivy honors in 1998 and 1999
 Women's Ivy League Outstanding Performers (2000)
 Women's First Team All-Ivy League (1999)
 Women's First Team All-Ivy League (2000) 
 Ivy League Player of the Year (2000)
 ECAC Goaltender of the Year (2000)
 First Team All-ECAC (2000)

References

American women's ice hockey goaltenders
Brown Bears women's ice hockey players
Living people
Patty Kazmaier Award winners
Year of birth missing (living people)
21st-century American women